Palestinian Haitians are Haitians of Palestinian descent, or Palestinians with Haitian citizenship.

Notable Palestinian Haitians
 Antoine Izméry, murdered wealthy businessman and political activist
 Nathalie Handal, award-winning poet, writer, and playwright

See also

 Arab Haitians
 Mulatto Haitians
 Lebanese Haitians
 Syrian Haitians
 White Haitians

References

Arab Haitian
Ethnic groups in Haiti
 
Haiti